|}

The Champion Stakes is a Group 1 flat horse race in Great Britain open to thoroughbreds aged three years or older. It is run at Ascot over a distance of 1 mile and 2 furlongs (2,012 metres), and it is scheduled to take place as part of British Champions Day each year in October.

History
The event was established in 1877, and it was originally held at Newmarket. The inaugural running was won by Springfield. By the end of the century it had been won by five Classic winners.

The present system of race grading was introduced in 1971, and the Champion Stakes was classed at the highest level, Group 1.

The race was included in the Breeders' Cup Challenge series in 2009 and 2010. The winner earned an automatic invitation to compete in the Breeders' Cup Turf.

The Champion Stakes was transferred to Ascot in 2011. It became part of a newly created fixture called British Champions Day. It now serves as the middle-distance final of the British Champions Series.

With an increased prize fund of £1,300,000, the Champion Stakes was Britain's richest horse race in 2011. The status was reclaimed by The Derby in 2012.

Records
Most successful horse (3 wins):
 Tristan – 1882, 1883, 1884

Leading jockey (6 wins):
 Danny Maher – Osboch (1901), Pretty Polly (1905), Polymelus (1906), Llangwm (1908), Bayardo (1909), Lemberg (1910)
 Charlie Elliott – Ellangowan (1923), Asterus (1927), Goyescas (1931), Djeddah (1949), Dynamiter (1951, 1952)

Leading trainer (8 wins):
 Alec Taylor Jr. – Sceptre (1903), Bayardo (1909), Lemberg (1910, 1911), Gay Crusader (1917), My Dear (1918), Buchan (1919), Picaroon (1925)

Leading owner (6 wins):
 HH Aga Khan III – Rustom Pasha (1930), Dastur (1933, dead-heat), Umidwar (1934), Nasrullah (1943), Migoli (1947), Hafiz (1955)

Dam of two winners:
 Kind- Frankel (2012) Noble Mission (2014)

Winners

See also
 Horse racing in Great Britain
 List of British flat horse races

References

 Paris-Turf: 
 Racing Post:

 galopp-sieger.de – Champion Stakes.
 horseracingintfed.com – International Federation of Horseracing Authorities – Champion Stakes (2018).
 pedigreequery.com – Champion Stakes.
 
 Race Recordings 

Flat races in Great Britain
Ascot Racecourse
Open middle distance horse races
Recurring sporting events established in 1877
British Champions Series
1877 establishments in England